The Indonesian province of Central Java comprises the following 29 regencies (kabupaten) and 6 cities (kota, previously kotamadya and kota pradja).

The districts are listed below with their areas and populations at the 2000, 2010 and 2020 Censuses, and are grouped (for convenience) according to the now defunct residenties in which they were formerly situated.

Notes: The regencies now appear in the formal order prescribed by the Indonesian Statistics Board (Badan Pusat Statistik).(a) the Southwestern region equates to the former Dutch East Indies Residentie Banjoemas.(b) the Southern region equates to the former Dutch East Indies Residentie Kedoe, with the removal of the Temanggung Regency.(c) the Southeastern region equates to the former Dutch East Indies Residentie Soerakarta (including the Residentie Klaten), formerly the Surakarta Sunanate. It also equates to the Surakarta extended metropolitan zone (Subosukawonosraten).(d) the Northeastern region equates to the former Dutch East Indies Residentie Djepara-Rembang, with the addition of the Grobogan Regency which is now listed with it by BPS.(e) the Northern region equates to the former Dutch East Indies Residentie Semerang, with the removal of the Grobogan Regency. It also equates to the Semerang Metropolitan zone (Kedungsapur). The Temanggung Regency is now included with this region by BPS (listed between Semerang Regenmcy and Kendal Regency).(f) the Northeastern region equates to the former Dutch East Indies Residentie Pekalongan.

See also
Central Java

Central Java
Regencies and cities
Central Java